Gregor von Bochmann (23 September 1878, Düsseldorf – 20 September 1914, near Laon) was a German sculptor. He is usually referred to as The Younger to dostinguish him from his father.

Life and work 
He was born to the painter, Gregor von Bochmann, and his wife Emilie, daughter of the industrialist, . He studied at the Kunstakademie Düsseldorf with the sculptor, Karl Janssen. In 1905, he married Marianne Feddersen, daughter of the landscape painter, . Around 1907, he moved into one of the studios belonging to August Bauer, on the Grafenberger Allee. He eventually established his own studio on the Kurfürstenstraße.

At the beginning of World War I, he became a volunteer officer in the 3rd Westphalian Landwehr regiment of the VII Army Corps. In September 1914, he was killed during the First Battle of the Aisne. Marianne also died before the end of the war, and their two children were raised by his parents.

His themes were originally inspired by his father's works, but he cane to prefer an approach based on the Frisian themes of his father-in-law. In 1904 his sculpture "Farewell", was awarded the large gold state medal in Vienna. He also exhibited in Dresden, Cologne and Munich. Both figures  were originally naked, but the older boy was later clothed, due to complaints that the statue was indecent. That same year saw the creation of his "Linnenbauerdenkmal" (Linen Maker Monument) in Herford.

In 1917, a memorial exhibition was held at the Alte Kunsthalle. In 1932 "Farewell" was installed in Oberkassel.

References

Further reading 
 Günter Meissner (Ed.): Allgemeines Künstlerlexikon: Die bildenden Künstler aller Zeiten und Völker. K.G. Saur Verlag, 1992 
 Obituray by W. Gischler in: Wilhelm Schäfer, (Ed.): Die Rheinlande. #XV, March 1915, Verlag A. Bagel
 Kuno Hagen: Lexikon deutschabltischer Künstler. 20. Jahrhundert. Verlag Wissenschaft und Politik, Cologne, 1983, pg.20

External links 

 Gregor von Bochmann: Homepage
 The Linen Maker in Herford (statue)

1878 births
1914 deaths
20th-century German sculptors
Kunstakademie Düsseldorf alumni
German military personnel killed in World War I
Artists from Düsseldorf
German Army personnel of World War I